Henry Scott Baesler (born July 9, 1941) is an American Democratic politician and former Representative from the Commonwealth of Kentucky.

Life and career
Baesler was born in Lexington, Kentucky. He graduated from the University of Kentucky in 1963 and earned a J.D. degree in 1966. While at the university, Baesler played basketball under legendary coach Adolph Rupp. Over his final two seasons, Baesler maintained a per game average of 10.3 points, 4 rebounds, 3 assists, while shooting 83% from the foul line.

After graduating from law school, Baesler practiced law and served as an administrator for Legal Aid, Inc., a nonprofit entity that provides free legal services to indigent persons facing criminal charges. He later served as a District Court Judge in Fayette County for some years before serving as mayor of Lexington from 1982 to 1993.

In 1991, Baesler ran for governor in a four-way Democratic primary and was defeated, 184,703 to 149,352, by Brereton Jones, who won the general election over Republican Larry Hopkins.

In 1992, Baesler was elected to the U.S. House of Representatives from the 6th Congressional District of Kentucky after Hopkins declined to seek an eighth term; Hopkins had never recovered from being heavily defeated by Jones in the governor's race. Baesler served in the House for three terms.  In 1996, he defeated Ernie Fletcher by a vote of 125,999 to 100,231. He passed up likely re-election in 1998 to run for the Senate seat of retiring Democratic whip Wendell Ford. Baesler won a narrow (4.9 percentage points) primary victory over Louisville businessman Charlie Owen and Lieutenant Governor Steve Henry, but was very narrowly defeated in the general election (0.6 points) by fellow congressman Jim Bunning, a Republican. Baesler assumed early on that he had no chance of carrying Bunning's 4th District, based in the Cincinnati suburbs. He aired almost no ads in the Cincinnati television market. This came back to haunt Baesler in November, as Bunning swamped him in the 4th, winning by a margin that Baesler couldn't make up in the rest of the state. Baesler barely won his own district, which came as something of an embarrassment.

In 2000, Baesler tried to regain his House seat against the Republican who had replaced him, Ernie Fletcher. Fletcher had lost badly to Baesler in 1996 after Baesler painted him as an extremist, but by 2000 Baesler was badly wounded from his narrow loss to Bunning. He wasn't helped when Democratic presidential candidate Al Gore all but conceded Kentucky to Republican George W. Bush in August. Earlier, all four of Lexington's TV stations pulled a Democratic Congressional Campaign Committee ad for Baesler, claiming the ad falsely charged Fletcher with cutting funding for education. In the general election, Fletcher defeated Baesler by 18 points as Bush carried the state by 14.

References

External links

record maintained by the Washington Post
 

1941 births
Living people
Mayors of Lexington, Kentucky
Kentucky Wildcats men's basketball players
University of Kentucky College of Law alumni
Kentucky lawyers
Kentucky state court judges
Democratic Party members of the United States House of Representatives from Kentucky